This article details the 2009–10 UEFA Europa League qualifying phase and play-off round.

All times CEST (UTC+2)

Teams
This table shows the path of all 174 teams involved in the qualifying phase and play-off round, including the 15 losing teams from the Champions League third qualifying round which joined at the play-off round (marked by CL). 38 teams qualified for the group stage to join the 10 losing teams from the Champions League play-off round.

CL-c Losing teams from the Champions League third qualifying round (Champions Path)

CL-n Losing teams from the Champions League third qualifying round (Non-Champions Path)

First qualifying round

Seeding
Teams with a coefficient of at least 1.332 were seeded.

Matches

|}

Notes:
Note 1: MTZ-RIPO Minsk, FK Vėtra, Rosenborg, Rudar Velenje, Široki Brijeg and The New Saints were originally drawn to play the first leg at home, but their ties were reversed so that their opponents would host the first legs.

First leg

Notes
Note 2: Played in Baku at Tofik Bakhramov Stadium as Simurq Zaqatala's Zaqatala City Stadium did not meet UEFA criteria.
Note 3: Played in Yerevan at Hanrapetakan Stadium as Banants's Banants Stadium did not meet UEFA criteria.
Note 4: Played in Ta' Qali at Centenary Stadium.
Note 5: Played in Tallinn at Lilleküla Stadium as Narva Trans's Kreenholmi Staadion did not meet UEFA criteria.
Note 6: Played in Luxembourg at Stade Josy Barthel as Grevenmacher's Op Flohr Stadion did not meet UEFA criteria.
Note 7: Played in Tórshavn at Gundadalur as NSÍ Runavík's Runavík Stadium did not meet UEFA criteria.
Note 8: Played in Lurgan at Mourneview Park as Lisburn Distillery's New Grosvenor Stadium is undergoing renovative work.
Note 9: Played in Airdrie at Excelsior Stadium as Motherwell's Fir Park is undergoing extensive renovative work.

Second leg

Zimbru Chișinău won 3–2 on aggregate.

Zestaponi won 11–1 on aggregate.

Helsingborg won 4–2 on aggregate.

Haladás 2–2 Irtysh on aggregate. Haladás won on away goals.

Spartak Trnava won 5–2 on aggregate.

MTZ-RIPO won 3–2 on aggregate.

Dinamo Minsk won 3–2 on aggregate.

Bnei Yehuda won 4–0 on aggregate.

Dinaburg won 2–1 on aggregate.

Slaven Belupo won 1–0 on aggregate.

Olimpi Rustavi won 4–0 on aggregate.

Lahti won 4–3 on aggregate.

FK Vėtra won 6–0 on aggregate.

Rosenborg won 6–1 on aggregate.

Rudar Velenje won 6–1 on aggregate.

Anorthosis Famagusta won 7–1 on aggregate.

Vllaznia Shkodër won 3–2 on aggregate.

Fram won 4–2 on aggregate.

Motherwell won 3–1 on aggregate.

Široki Brijeg won 2–1 on aggregate.

Polonia Warsaw won 2–1 on aggregate.

Randers won 7–0 on aggregate.

Valletta won 5–2 on aggregate.

Notes
Note 10: Played in Karagandy at Shakhtyor Stadium as Irtysh's Pavlodar Central Stadium did not meet UEFA criteria.
Note 11: Played in Baku at Tofik Bakhramov Stadium as Inter Baku's Shafa Stadium did not meet UEFA criteria.
Note 12: Played in Skopje at Gradski Stadion as Renova's City Stadium Tetovo did not meet UEFA criteria.
Note 13: Played in Tallinn at Lilleküla Stadium as Nõmme Kalju's Hiiu Stadium did not meet UEFA criteria.
Note 14: Played in Ta' Qali at Centenary Stadium.
Note 15: Played in Tirana at Qemal Stafa as Dinamo Tirana's Selman Stërmasi stadium did not meet UEFA criteria.
Note 16: Played in Luxembourg at Stade Josy Barthel as Käerjéng's Stade um Bëchel did not meet UEFA criteria.
Note 17: Played in Llanelli at Parc y Scarlets as Llanelli's Stebonheath Park did not meet UEFA criteria.
Note 18: Played in Lurgan at Mourneview Park as Linfield's Windsor Park did not meet UEFA criteria.

Second qualifying round

Seeding
Teams with a coefficient of at least 1.958 were seeded, except Lahti, the lowest ranked of the teams from Finland.

Matches

|}

Notes:
Note 19: Paços de Ferreira, Polonia Warsaw and Rabotnički were originally drawn to play the first leg at home, but their ties were reversed so that their opponents would host the first legs.
Note 20: Second leg match suspended in the 11th minute due to inclement weather and poor drainage on the waterlogged pitch. After 55 minutes the match resumed.

First leg

Notes
Note 21: Played in Ta' Qali at Centenary Stadium.
Note 22: Played in Lurgan at Mourneview Park as Crusaders's Seaview did not meet UEFA criteria.
Note 23: Played in Vitebsk at Vitebsky Central Sport Complex as Naftan's Atlant Stadium did not meet UEFA criteria.
Note 24: Played in Belgrade at Partizan Stadium as Sevojno's Stadion kraj Valjaonice did not meet UEFA criteria.
Note 25: Played in Burgas at Lazur Stadium as Cherno More's Ticha Stadium did not meet UEFA criteria.
Note 26: Played in Luxembourg at Stade Josy Barthel as Differdange's Stade du Thillenberg did not meet UEFA criteria.
Note 27: Played in San Marino at Montecchio.

Second leg

Legia Warsaw won 4–0 on aggregate.

Dinamo Tbilisi won 4–3 on aggregate.

Karabakh won 1–0 on aggregate.

Metalurh Donetsk won 5–1 on aggregate.

Rabotnički won 5–3 on aggregate.

Petrovac won 4–3 on aggregate.

NAC Breda won 8–0 on aggregate.

Lahti won 2–1 on aggregate.

St Patrick's Athletic won 2–1 on aggregate.

Brøndby won 4–2 on aggregate.

Kaunas 1–1 Sevojno on aggregate. Sevojno won on away goals.

Polonia Warsaw won 5–0 on aggregate.

Bnei Yehuda won 5–0 on aggregate.

FK Vėtra won 3–2 on aggregate.

MŠK Žilina won 3–0 on aggregate.

Elfsborg won 3–0 on aggregate.

Tromsø won 4–1 won aggregate.

Randers won 2–1 on aggregate.

Basel won 7–1 on aggregate.

Maccabi Netanya won 3–0 on aggregate.

Slaven Belupo won 12–2 on aggregate.

KR won 3–1 on aggregate.

Cherno More won 4–0 on aggregate.

Sarajevo won 2–1 on aggregate.

Vaduz won 2–1 on aggregate.

Steaua București won 4–1 on aggregate.

Derry City won 2–1 on aggregate.

Omonia won 8–1 on aggregate.

Gent 2–2 Naftan on aggregate. Gent won on away goals.

Galatasaray won 3–1 on aggregate.

Rapid Wien won 8–0 on aggregate.

Sturm Graz won 3–2 on aggregate.

Slavija won 3–1 on aggregate.

Red Star Belgrade won 5–0 on aggregate.

Motherwell won 8–2 on aggregate.

Helsingborg won 4–3 on aggregate.

Sigma Olomouc won 3–1 on aggregate.

Rijeka won 3–1 on aggregate.

Honka won 3–0 on aggregate.

Paços de Ferreira won 1–0 on aggregate.

Notes
Note 28: Played in Baku at Tofik Bakhramov Stadium as Karabakh's Guzanli Olympic Stadium did not meet UEFA criteria.
Note 29: Played in Nikšić at Stadion Gradski as Petrovac's Pod Malim Brdom Stadium did not meet UEFA criteria.
Note 30: Played in Yerevan at Hanrapetakan Stadium as Gandzasar's Lernagorts Stadium did not meet UEFA criteria.
Note 31: Played in Ta' Qali at Centenary Stadium.
Note 32: Played in Andorra la Vella at Estadi Comunal d'Aixovall.
Note 33: Played in Tel Aviv at Bloomfield Stadium as Maccabi Netanya's Sar-Tov Stadium will be demolished soon.
Note 34: Played in Tiraspol at Sheriff Stadium as Iskra-Stal's Orăşănesc Stadium did not meet UEFA criteria.
Note 35: Played in Sarajevo at Asim Ferhatović Hase Stadium as Slavija's Gradski SRC Slavija Stadium did not meet UEFA criteria.
Note 36: Played in Airdrie at Excelsior Stadium as Motherwell's Fir Park is undergoing extensive renovative work.
Note 37: Played in Wrexham at Racecourse Ground as Bangor City's Farrar Road Stadium did not meet UEFA criteria and will be demolished soon.
Note 38: Played in Guimarães at Estádio D. Afonso Henriques as Paços de Ferreira's Estádio da Mata Real did not meet UEFA criteria.

Third qualifying round

Seeding
Teams with a coefficient of at least 7.826 were seeded. Karabakh, Petrovac and Slavija were also seeded because the draw was held before the second qualifying round, in which they beat teams who would have been seeded.

Matches

|}

Notes
Note 39: Sarajevo, Gent, Galatasaray and APOP Kinyras were originally drawn to play the first leg at home, but their ties were reversed so that their opponents would host the first legs.

First leg

Notes
Note 40: Played in Podgorica at Stadion Pod Goricom as Petrovac's Pod Malim Brdom Stadium did not meet UEFA criteria.
Note 41: Played in Helsinki at Finnair Stadium as Honka's Tapiolan Urheilupuisto is undergoing renovative work.
Note 42: Played in Tel Aviv at Bloomfield Stadium as Maccabi Netanya's Sar-Tov Stadium will be demolished soon.
Note 43: Played in Belgrade at Stadion Crvena Zvezda as Vojvodina's Karađorđe Stadium did not meet UEFA criteria.
Note 44: Played in Sofia at Vasil Levski National Stadium as CSKA Sofia's Balgarska Armiya Stadium is undergoing renovative work.
Note 45: Played in Sarajevo at Asim Ferhatović Hase Stadium as Slavija's Gradski SRC Slavija Stadium did not meet UEFA criteria.
Note 46: Played in Belgrade at Partizan Stadium as Sevojno's Stadion kraj Valjaonice did not meet UEFA criteria.

Second leg

Vaslui won 3–1 on aggregate.

Krylia Sovetov 3–3 St Patrick's Athletic on aggregate. St Patrick's Athletic won on away goals.

Karabakh won 3–1 on aggregate.

Košice won 5–1 on aggregate.

Slovan Liberec won 3–0 on aggregate.

PSV won 2–0 on aggregate.

Lech Poznań won 7–3 on aggregate.

Hapoel Tel Aviv won 4–2 on aggregate.

Tromsø won 4–1 on aggregate.

Club Brugge won 4–3 on aggregate.

Lille won 4–0 on aggregate.

Sturm Graz won 7–1 on aggregate.

Rapid Wien won 4–3 on aggregate.

Austria Wien won 5–3 on aggregate.

Basel won 5–3 on aggregate.

Young Boys 2–2 Athletic Bilbao on aggregate. Athletic Bilbao won on away goals.

Galatasaray won 10–1 on aggregate.

Legia Warsaw 3–3 Brøndby on aggregate. Brøndby won on away goals.

CSKA Sofia won 2–1 on aggregate.

Metalurh Donetsk won 5–0 on aggregate.

NAC Breda won 4–1 on aggregate.

Fenerbahçe won 6–2 on aggregate.

Sigma Olomouc won 8–1 on aggregate.

Metalist Kharkiv won 4–1 on aggregate.

Elfsborg won 4–1 on aggregate.

Odense won 7–3 on aggregate.

Sarajevo 3–3 Helsingborg on aggregate. Sarajevo won 5–4 on penalties.

Hamburg won 4–1 on aggregate.

Roma won 10–2 on aggregate.

PAOK 2–2 Vålerenga on aggregate. PAOK won on away goals.

Steaua București won 6–1 on aggregate.

Red Star Belgrade won 5–4 on aggregate.

MŠK Žilina won 2–1 on aggregate.

Fulham won 6–0 on aggregate.

Bnei Yehuda won 2–0 on aggregate.

Notes
Note 47: Played in Baku at the Tofik Bakhramov Stadium as Karabakh's Guzanli Olympic Stadium did not meet UEFA criteria.
Note 48: Played in Burgas at the Lazur Stadium as Cherno More's Ticha Stadium did not meet UEFA criteria.
Note 49: Played in Wronki at the Stadion Amica as Lech Poznań's Stadion Miejski is undergoing renovative work.
Note 50: Played in Villeneuve d'Ascq at Stadium Lille-Metropole as Lille's Stade Grimonprez Jooris had been replaced temporarily by that stadium. In 2012, Stadium Grimonprez Jooris will be replaced definitely by Stade Borne de l'Espoir.
Note 51: Played in Nicosia at the GSP Stadium as APOP Kinyras's Peyia Municipal Stadium did not meet UEFA criteria.
Note 52: Played in Domžale at the Sports Park as Interblock's ŽŠD Ljubljana Stadium did not meet UEFA criteria.
Note 53: Budapest Honvéd had to play behind closed doors due to their fans having racist conduct and displaying an illicit banner during an Intertoto Cup match.
Note 54: Played in Airdrie at the Excelsior Stadium as Motherwell's Fir Park is undergoing extensive renovative work.
Note 55: Played in Guimarães at the Estádio D. Afonso Henriques as Paços de Ferreira's Estádio da Mata Real did not meet UEFA criteria.

Play-off round

Seeding
Teams with a coefficient of at least 12.890 were seeded.

Matches

|}

Notes
Note 56: Roma, PSV Eindhoven, Shakhtar Donetsk, Sparta Prague, Zenit Saint Petersburg and Dynamo Moscow were originally drawn to play the first leg at home, but their ties were reversed so that their opponents would host the first legs.
Note 57: The match was abandoned at 0–2 in the 88th minute after one Dinamo București fan entered the playing field and other fans invaded the running track around the pitch. The UEFA Control and Disciplinary Body awarded a default 0–3 defeat against Dinamo during an emergency meeting on 25 August.

First leg

Notes
Note 58: Played in Sofia at Vasil Levski National Stadium as CSKA Sofia's Balgarska Armiya Stadium is undergoing renovative work.
Note 59: The first of two home games which Steaua București have to play behind closed doors because their fans had flown banners offensive to Újpest in the second qualifying round.
Note 60: Played in Wronki at Stadion Amica as Lech Poznań's Stadion Miejski is undergoing renovative work.
Note 61: Played in Geneva at Stade de Genève as Sion's Stade Tourbillon did not meet UEFA criteria.

Second leg

Shakhtar Donetsk won 5–0 on aggregate.

Werder Bremen won 8–3 on aggregate.

Fulham won 3–2 on aggregate.

Twente won 3–1 on aggregate.

Hapoel Tel Aviv won 3–2 on aggregate.

CSKA Sofia won 2–1 on aggregate.

Everton won 5–1 on aggregate.

Hertha BSC won 4–3 on aggregate.

Ajax won 7–1 on aggregate.

Nacional won 5–4 on aggregate.

CFR Cluj won 3–2 on aggregate.

Heerenveen 1–1 PAOK on aggregate. Heerenveen won on away goals.

Lille won 6–3 on aggregate.

Lazio won 3–1 on aggregate.

Athletic Bilbao won 4–3 on aggregate.

Sturm Graz won 2–1 on aggregate.

Austria Wien won 5–4 on aggregate.

Dinamo București 3–3 Slovan Liberec on aggregate. Dinamo București won 9–8 on penalties.

Partizan won 3–1 on aggregate.

Basel won 8–2 on aggregate.

AEK Athens won 4–2 on aggregate.

Galatasaray won 6–1 on aggregate.

BATE Borisov won 4–1 on aggregate.

Sparta Prague won 3–0 on aggregate.

Villarreal won 9–2 on aggregate.

Lech Poznań 1–1 Club Brugge on aggregate. Club Brugge won 4–3 on penalties.

Slavia Prague won 4–2 on aggregate.

Hamburg won 8–2 on aggregate.

Fenerbahçe won 4–2 on aggregate.

Genoa won 4–2 on aggregate.

Dinamo Zagreb won 4–2 on aggregate.

Roma won 10–4 on aggregate.

PSV won 2–0 on aggregate.

Benfica won 5–2 on aggregate.

Steaua București won 5–1 on aggregate.

Rapid Wien 2–2 Aston Villa on aggregate. Rapid Wien won on away goals.

Toulouse won 3–2 on aggregate.

Valencia won 7–1 on aggregate.

Notes
Note 62: Played on 25 August due to Shakhtar Donetsk's participation in the 2009 UEFA Super Cup.
Note 63: Played in Baku at Tofik Bakhramov Stadium as Karabakh's Guzanli Olympic Stadium did not meet UEFA criteria.
Note 64: Played in Khimki at Arena Khimki as Dynamo Moscow's Dynamo Stadium is undergoing renovative work.
Note 65: Played in Berlin at Friedrich Ludwig Jahn Sportpark as Hertha BSC's Olympiastadion hosts 2009 World Championships in Athletics.
Note 66: Played in Villeneuve d'Ascq at Stadium Lille-Metropole as Lille's Stade Grimonprez Jooris had been replaced temporarily by that stadium. In 2012, Stadium Grimonprez Jooris will be replaced definitely by Stade Borne de l'Espoir.
Note 67: Played in Tallinn at Lilleküla Stadium as Levadia's Kadrioru Stadium did not meet UEFA criteria.
Note 68: Played in Dublin at RDS Arena as St Patrick's Athletic's Richmond Park did not meet UEFA criteria.
 Attendances from official UEFA Report Report

References

External links
2009–10 UEFA Europa League, UEFA.com

Qualifying Rounds
UEFA Europa League qualifying rounds